South Somerset is a local government district in the English county of Somerset. The district has a population of about 158,000, and has Yeovil as its administrative centre.

In the United Kingdom, the term listed building refers to a building or other structure officially designated as being of special architectural, historical or cultural significance; Grade II* structures are those considered to be "particularly significant buildings of more than local interest". Listing was begun by a provision in the Town and Country Planning Act 1947. Once listed, severe restrictions are imposed on the modifications allowed to a building's structure or its fittings. In England, the authority for listing under the Planning (Listed Buildings and Conservation Areas) Act 1990 rests with Historic England, a non-departmental public body sponsored by the Department for Digital, Culture, Media and Sport; local authorities have a responsibility to regulate and enforce the planning regulations.

There are 266 Grade II* listed buildings in South Somerset.

Buildings

|- class="vcard with_image"
! scope="row" class="fn org" | 1–2 Castle Cottages
| class="label" | Chilthorne Domer
| class="category" | House

| Early-mid 17th century

| 

| 1057244
   

|- class="vcard without_image"
! scope="row" class="fn org" | Abbey House
| class="label" | South Cadbury
| class="category" | House

| 15th century

| 

| 1258892
 style="vertical-align:center; text-align:center;"    .

|- class="vcard with_image"
! scope="row" class="fn org" | Admiral Hood Monument
| class="label" | Compton Dundon
| class="category" | Monument

| Early 19th century

| 

| 1056743
   

|- class="vcard with_image"
! scope="row" class="fn org" | Ansford Lodge
| class="label" | Ansford
| class="category" | House

| Late 18th century

| 

| 1307605
   

|- class="vcard without_image"
! scope="row" class="fn org" | Ashford House
| class="label" | Ilton
| class="category" | House

| Probably 17th century

| 

| 1057048
 style="vertical-align:center; text-align:center;"    

|- class="vcard without_image"
! scope="row" class="fn org" | Ashington Manor
| class="label" | Chilton Cantelo
| class="category" | House

| 15th century

| 

| 1056833
 style="vertical-align:center; text-align:center;"    

|- class="vcard without_image"
! scope="row" class="fn org" | Ashlar House
| class="label" | Martock
| class="category" | House

| Early 18th century

| 

| 1265440
 style="vertical-align:center; text-align:center;"    

|- class="vcard with_image"
! scope="row" class="fn org" | Avishays
| class="label" | Chaffcombe
| class="category" | House

| 17th century

| 

| 1366399
   

|- class="vcard with_image"
! scope="row" class="fn org" | Balsam House
| class="label" | Wincanton
| class="category" | House

| 17th century

| 

| 1238556
   

|- class="vcard with_image"
! scope="row" class="fn org" | Baptist Church
| class="label" | Chard
| class="category" | Schoolroom

| Later 19th century

| 

| 1206076
   

|- class="vcard without_image"
! scope="row" class="fn org" | Bromes House
| class="label" | Isle Abbotts
| class="category" | Farmhouse

| 1627

| 

| 1249589
 style="vertical-align:center; text-align:center;"    

|- class="vcard without_image"
! scope="row" class="fn org" | Burton Pynsent House
| class="label" | Curry Rivel
| class="category" | House

| Pre- c. 1756

| 

| 1373913
 style="vertical-align:center; text-align:center;"    

|- class="vcard without_image"
! scope="row" class="fn org" | Candle Cottage and garden walls and railing to East
| class="label" | Crewkerne
| class="category" | House

| Late 15th century

| 

| 1202997
 style="vertical-align:center; text-align:center;"    

|- class="vcard without_image"
! scope="row" class="fn org" | Cathanger
| class="label" | Fivehead
| class="category" | House

| 1988

| 

| 1263673
 style="vertical-align:center; text-align:center;"    

|- class="vcard with_image"
! scope="row" class="fn org" | Chapel Cross
| class="label" | South Cadbury
| class="category" | House

| 13th century

| 

| 1258890
   

|- class="vcard without_image"
! scope="row" class="fn org" | Chard Manor Farmhouse
| class="label" | Chard
| class="category" | Farmhouse

| 15th or early 16th century

| 

| 1197429
 style="vertical-align:center; text-align:center;"    

|- class="vcard with_image"
! scope="row" class="fn org" | Chard School
| class="label" | Chard
| class="category" | House

| 1583

| 

| 1205594
   

|- class="vcard with_image"
! scope="row" class="fn org" | Charlton House
| class="label" | Charlton Mackrell
| class="category" | House

| Extended

| 

| 1056766
   

|- class="vcard without_image"
! scope="row" class="fn org" | Church Cross in Churchyard of St James' Church
| class="label" | Preston Plucknett
| class="category" | Cross

| Possibly 15th century

| 

| 1173415
 style="vertical-align:center; text-align:center;"    

|- class="vcard without_image"
! scope="row" class="fn org" | Church House with integral orangery
| class="label" | Yeovil
| class="category" | House

| c. 1770

| 

| 1055715
 style="vertical-align:center; text-align:center;"    

|- class="vcard with_image"
! scope="row" class="fn org" | Church of All Saints
| class="label" | Castle Cary
| class="category" | Church

| 19th century

| 

| 1056241
   

|- class="vcard with_image"
! scope="row" class="fn org" | Church of All Saints
| class="label" | Closworth
| class="category" | Church

| 13th century

| 

| 1057233
   

|- class="vcard with_image"
! scope="row" class="fn org" | Church of All Saints
| class="label" | Kingsdon
| class="category" | Church

| 15th century

| 

| 1223613
   

|- class="vcard with_image"
! scope="row" class="fn org" | Church of All Saints
| class="label" | Kingweston
| class="category" | Church

| 1852-1855

| 

| 1307683
   

|- class="vcard with_image"
! scope="row" class="fn org" | Church of All Saints
| class="label" | Lopen
| class="category" | Church

| 12th century

| 

| 1056994
   

|- class="vcard with_image"
! scope="row" class="fn org" | Church of All Saints
| class="label" | Merriott
| class="category" | Church

| 13th century

| 

| 1175447
   

|- class="vcard with_image"
! scope="row" class="fn org" | Church of St Andrew
| class="label" | Aller
| class="category" | Church

| 11th century

| 

| 1227327
   

|- class="vcard with_image"
! scope="row" class="fn org" | Church of St Andrew
| class="label" | Ansford
| class="category" | Church

| 15th century

| 

| 1307553
   

|- class="vcard with_image"
! scope="row" class="fn org" | Church of St Andrew
| class="label" | Thorne Coffin
| class="category" | Church

| 1613

| 

| 1263070
   

|- class="vcard with_image"
! scope="row" class="fn org" | Church of St Andrew
| class="label" | Compton Dundon
| class="category" | Church

| Early 14th century

| 

| 1176782
   

|- class="vcard with_image"
! scope="row" class="fn org" | Church of St Andrew
| class="label" | Dowlish Wake
| class="category" | Church

| 14th century

| 

| 1366405
   

|- class="vcard with_image"
! scope="row" class="fn org" | Church of St Andrew
| class="label" | Northover, Ilchester
| class="category" | Church

| 14th century

| 

| 1267315
   

|- class="vcard with_image"
! scope="row" class="fn org" | Church of St Andrew
| class="label" | Puckington
| class="category" | Church

| 13th century

| 

| 1057727
   

|- class="vcard with_image"
! scope="row" class="fn org" | Church of St Bartholomew
| class="label" | Yeovilton
| class="category" | Church

| c. 1300

| 

| 1056787
   

|- class="vcard with_image"
! scope="row" class="fn org" | Church of St Catherine
| class="label" | Montacute
| class="category" | Church

| 19th century

| 

| 1253547
   

|- class="vcard with_image"
! scope="row" class="fn org" | Church of St David
| class="label" | Barton St David
| class="category" | Church

| 12th century

| 

| 1176035
   

|- class="vcard with_image"
! scope="row" class="fn org" | Church of St James
| class="label" | East Lambrook, Kingsbury Episcopi
| class="category" | Church

| 19th century

| 

| 1056883
   

|- class="vcard with_image"
! scope="row" class="fn org" | Church of St James
| class="label" | Chilton Cantelo
| class="category" | Church

| 15th century

| 

| 1056835
   

|- class="vcard with_image"
! scope="row" class="fn org" | Church of St James
| class="label" | Preston Plucknett
| class="category" | Church

| 1420

| 

| 1346135
   

|- class="vcard with_image"
! scope="row" class="fn org" | Church of St John the Baptist
| class="label" | South Brewham
| class="category" | Church

| 13th century

| 

| 1056463
   

|- class="vcard with_image"
! scope="row" class="fn org" | Church of St John the Baptist
| class="label" | Pitney
| class="category" | Church

| 13th century

| 

| 1056546
   

|- class="vcard with_image"
! scope="row" class="fn org" | Church of St John the Baptist
| class="label" | Horsington
| class="category" | Church

| 15th century

| 

| 1238063
   

|- class="vcard with_image"
! scope="row" class="fn org" | Church of St John the Baptist
| class="label" | North Cheriton
| class="category" | Church

| 14th-century

| 

| 1274277
   

|- class="vcard with_image"
! scope="row" class="fn org" | Church of St John the Evangelist and All Saints
| class="label" | Kingstone
| class="category" | Church

| Post 1540

| 

| 1057025
   

|- class="vcard with_image"
! scope="row" class="fn org" | Church of St Lawrence
| class="label" | Cucklington
| class="category" | Church

| 13th century

| 

| 1274765
   

|- class="vcard with_image"
! scope="row" class="fn org" | Church of St Margaret
| class="label" | Middle Chinnock
| class="category" | Church

| 12th century

| 

| 1057169
   

|- class="vcard with_image"
! scope="row" class="fn org" | Church of St Martin of Tours
| class="label" | West Coker
| class="category" | Church

| 13th or 14th century

| 

| 1345829
   

|- class="vcard with_image"
! scope="row" class="fn org" | Church of St Mary
| class="label" | Buckland St Mary
| class="category" | Church

| 1853-1863

| 

| 1277983
   

|- class="vcard with_image"
! scope="row" class="fn org" | Church of St Mary
| class="label" | Abbas and Templecombe
| class="category" | Church

| 12th century

| 

| 1366329
   

|- class="vcard with_image"
! scope="row" class="fn org" | Church of St Mary
| class="label" | Charlton Mackrell
| class="category" | Church

| 13th century

| 

| 1056728
   

|- class="vcard with_image"
! scope="row" class="fn org" | Church of St Mary
| class="label" | Chilthorne Domer
| class="category" | Church

| 13th century

| 

| 1345756
   

|- class="vcard with_image"
! scope="row" class="fn org" | Church of St Mary
| class="label" | Compton Pauncefoot
| class="category" | Church

| Pre 1262

| 

| 1248577
   

|- class="vcard with_image"
! scope="row" class="fn org" | Church of St Mary
| class="label" | Donyatt
| class="category" | Church

| 15th century

| 

| 1057074
   

|- class="vcard with_image"
! scope="row" class="fn org" | Church of St Mary
| class="label" | Seavington St Mary
| class="category" | Church

| 13th century

| 

| 1307339
   

|- class="vcard with_image"
! scope="row" class="fn org" | Church of St Mary
| class="label" | Wambrook
| class="category" | Church

| Pre 1613

| 

| 1249439
   

|- class="vcard with_image"
! scope="row" class="fn org" | Church of St Mary
| class="label" | Yarlington
| class="category" | Church

| 11th century

| 

| 1056212
   

|- class="vcard with_image"
! scope="row" class="fn org" | Church of St Mary
| class="label" | Hardington Mandeville
| class="category" | Church

| Pre 1123

| 

| 1345795
   

|- class="vcard with_image"
! scope="row" class="fn org" | Church of St Mary Magdalen
| class="label" | Cricket Malherbie, Knowle St Giles
| class="category" | Church

| 1855

| 

| 1177461
   

|- class="vcard with_image"
! scope="row" class="fn org" | Church of St Mary Magdalene
| class="label" | Sparkford
| class="category" | Church

| 14th century

| 

| 1243352
   

|- class="vcard with_image"
! scope="row" class="fn org" | Church of St Mary Major
| class="label" | Ilchester
| class="category" | Church

| 13th century

| 

| 1345741
   

|- class="vcard with_image"
! scope="row" class="fn org" | Church of St Mary the Virgin
| class="label" | Stocklinch
| class="category" | Church

| 12th century

| 

| 1175580
   

|- class="vcard with_image"
! scope="row" class="fn org" | Church of St Mary the Virgin
| class="label" | Whitelackington
| class="category" | Church

| Early 14th century

| 

| 1057033
   

|- class="vcard with_image"
! scope="row" class="fn org" | Church of St Mary Magdalene
| class="label" | Barwick
| class="category" | Church

| 13th century

| 

| 1057217
   

|- class="vcard with_image"
! scope="row" class="fn org" | Church of St Michael
| class="label" | Blackford
| class="category" | Church

| 11th or 12th century

| 

| 1056557
   

|- class="vcard with_image"
! scope="row" class="fn org" | Church of St Michael
| class="label" | East Coker
| class="category" | Church

| Late 12th century

| 

| 1345781
   

|- class="vcard with_image"
! scope="row" class="fn org" | Church of St Michael
| class="label" | Cudworth
| class="category" | Church

| 12th century

| 

| 1366403
   

|- class="vcard with_image"
! scope="row" class="fn org" | Church of St Michael
| class="label" | Seavington St Michael
| class="category" | Church

| 12th century

| 

| 1057002
   

|- class="vcard with_image"
! scope="row" class="fn org" | Church of St Michael
| class="label" | Wayford
| class="category" | Church

| 13th century

| 

| 1056166
   

|- class="vcard with_image"
! scope="row" class="fn org" | Church of St Michael and All Angels
| class="label" | Chaffcombe
| class="category" | Church

| 1857-60

| 

| 1056177
   

|- class="vcard with_image"
! scope="row" class="fn org" | Church of St Michael and All Angels
| class="label" | Haselbury Plucknett
| class="category" | Church

| 14th century

| 

| 1056149
   

|- class="vcard with_image"
! scope="row" class="fn org" | Church of St Michael and All Angels
| class="label" | Penselwood
| class="category" | Church

| Mostly 15th century

| 

| 1238353
   

|- class="vcard with_image"
! scope="row" class="fn org" | Church of St Nicholas
| class="label" | Bratton Seymour
| class="category" | Church

| Saxon

| 

| 1177220
   

|- class="vcard with_image"
! scope="row" class="fn org" | Church of St Nicholas
| class="label" | Dinnington
| class="category" | Church

| 1863

| 

| 1345887
   

|- class="vcard with_image"
! scope="row" class="fn org" | Church of St Nicholas
| class="label" | Henstridge
| class="category" | Church

| 12th century

| 

| 1366325
   

|- class="vcard with_image"
! scope="row" class="fn org" | Church of St Nicholas
| class="label" | Holton
| class="category" | Church

| 14th century

| 

| 1056348
   

|- class="vcard with_image"
! scope="row" class="fn org" | Church of St Peter
| class="label" | Redlynch
| class="category" | Church

| c. 1750

| 

| 1176298
   

|- class="vcard with_image"
! scope="row" class="fn org" | Church of St Peter
| class="label" | Ilton
| class="category" | Church

| 12th century

| 

| 1057052
   

|- class="vcard with_image"
! scope="row" class="fn org" | Church of St Peter
| class="label" | South Barrow
| class="category" | Church

| 14th century

| 

| 1258889
   

|- class="vcard with_image"
! scope="row" class="fn org" | Church of St Peter and St Paul
| class="label" | Charlton Horethorne
| class="category" | Church

| 12th century

| 

| 1056366
   

|- class="vcard with_image"
! scope="row" class="fn org" | Church of St Peter and St Paul
| class="label" | Chiselborough
| class="category" | Church

| 17th century

| 

| 1345758
   

|- class="vcard with_image"
! scope="row" class="fn org" | Church of St Peter and St Paul
| class="label" | Odcombe
| class="category" | Church

| 13th century

| 

| 1241492
   

|- class="vcard with_image"
! scope="row" class="fn org" | Church of St Peter and St Paul
| class="label" | Wincanton
| class="category" | Church

| 1793

| 

| 1238534
   

|- class="vcard with_image"
! scope="row" class="fn org" | Church of St Roch
| class="label" | Pendomer, Closworth
| class="category" | Church

| 14th century

| 

| 1307971
   

|- class="vcard with_image"
! scope="row" class="fn org" | Church of St Stephen
| class="label" | Winsham
| class="category" | Church

| 13th century

| 

| 1177765
   

|- class="vcard with_image"
! scope="row" class="fn org" | Church of St Stephen
| class="label" | Charlton Musgrove
| class="category" | Church

| 13th century

| 

| 1346185
   

|- class="vcard with_image"
! scope="row" class="fn org" | Church of St Thomas
| class="label" | Cricket St Thomas
| class="category" | Church

| 1868

| 

| 1056183
   

|- class="vcard with_image"
! scope="row" class="fn org" | Church of St Thomas à Becket
| class="label" | South Cadbury
| class="category" | Church

| 13th century

| 

| 1258922
   

|- class="vcard with_image"
! scope="row" class="fn org" | Church of St Thomas of Canterbury
| class="label" | Lovington
| class="category" | Church

| 13th century

| 

| 1056528
   

|- class="vcard with_image"
! scope="row" class="fn org" | Church of the Blessed Virgin Mary
| class="label" | Ashill
| class="category" | Church

| 12th century

| 

| 1057100
   

|- class="vcard with_image"
! scope="row" class="fn org" | Church of the Holy Cross
| class="label" | Babcary
| class="category" | Church

| 14th century

| 

| 1277940
   

|- class="vcard with_image"
! scope="row" class="fn org" | Church of the Holy Cross
| class="label" | Weston Bampfylde, Sparkford
| class="category" | Church

| 13th century

| 

| 1243568
   

|- class="vcard with_image"
! scope="row" class="fn org" | Churchyard Cross in Churchyard of the Church of St Catherine
| class="label" | Drayton
| class="category" | Cross

| 15th century

| 

| 1236539
   

|- class="vcard with_image"
! scope="row" class="fn org" | Churchyard Cross, 10m west of the Church of All Saints
| class="label" | Closworth
| class="category" | Cross

| 15th century

| 

| 1307974
   

|- class="vcard without_image"
! scope="row" class="fn org" | Churchyard Cross, about 5m south of Nave, Church of St Aldhelm and St Eadburgha
| class="label" | Broadway
| class="category" | Cross

| Late 13th century-Early 14th century

| 

| 1057005
 style="vertical-align:center; text-align:center;"    

|- class="vcard without_image"
! scope="row" class="fn org" | Clapton Farmhouse
| class="label" | Cucklington
| class="category" | Farmhouse

| 1615

| 

| 1222398
 style="vertical-align:center; text-align:center;"    

|- class="vcard with_image"
! scope="row" class="fn org" | Clapton Mill (Lockyer and Son), with aqueduct to north east
| class="label" | West Crewkerne
| class="category" | Mill

| Rebuilt 1864

| 

| 1056856
   

|- class="vcard with_image"
! scope="row" class="fn org" | Collins Chest Tomb, 2m south of the south east Nave window, Church of All Saints
| class="label" | Closworth
| class="category" | Chest tomb

| 1609

| 

| 1345791
   

|- class="vcard with_image"
! scope="row" class="fn org" | Congregational Chapel, now United Reformed Church
| class="label" | Kingsbury Episcopi
| class="category" | Chapel

| 1729

| 

| 1236948
   

|- class="vcard without_image"
! scope="row" class="fn org" | Coombe Hill House
| class="label" | Bruton
| class="category" | House

| 1820-1830

| 

| 1346172
 style="vertical-align:center; text-align:center;"    

|- class="vcard without_image"
! scope="row" class="fn org" | Cosenes Monument in Churchyard 5 metres south south east of South Transept, Church of All Saints
| class="label" | Castle Cary
| class="category" | Chest tomb

| 16th century

| 

| 1366395
 style="vertical-align:center; text-align:center;"    

|- class="vcard without_image"
! scope="row" class="fn org" | Court Farm House
| class="label" | Barwick
| class="category" | Farmhouse

| Early 17th century

| 

| 1057226
 style="vertical-align:center; text-align:center;"    

|- class="vcard with_image"
! scope="row" class="fn org" | Court House
| class="label" | Martock
| class="category" | House

| Late 16th century

| 

| 1227536
   

|- class="vcard without_image"
! scope="row" class="fn org" | Court House
| class="label" | South Petherton
| class="category" | House

| 18th century

| 

| 1056954
 style="vertical-align:center; text-align:center;"    

|- class="vcard without_image"
! scope="row" class="fn org" | Craigmore House
| class="label" | Somerton
| class="category" | House

| 17th-18th century

| 

| 1307586
 style="vertical-align:center; text-align:center;"    

|- class="vcard without_image"
! scope="row" class="fn org" | Crane Farmhouse
| class="label" | Somerton
| class="category" | Farmhouse

| Medieval

| 

| 1346065
 style="vertical-align:center; text-align:center;"    

|- class="vcard without_image"
! scope="row" class="fn org" | Cricket Court, and attached balustraded walling around basement areas
| class="label" | Cricket Malherbie
| class="category" | House

| 1811

| 

| 1056158
 style="vertical-align:center; text-align:center;"    

|- class="vcard without_image"
! scope="row" class="fn org" | Danyell Monument in churchyard about 0.5 metres south of Chancel, Church of St Thomas of Canterbury
| class="label" | Lovington
| class="category" | Chest tomb

| Early 17th century

| 

| 1277744
 style="vertical-align:center; text-align:center;"    

|- class="vcard without_image"
! scope="row" class="fn org" | Darvole Farm House
| class="label" | East Coker
| class="category" | Farmhouse

| 16th century

| 

| 1176487
 style="vertical-align:center; text-align:center;"    

|- class="vcard without_image"
! scope="row" class="fn org" | Dental Surgery / Priors House
| class="label" | Wincanton
| class="category" | House

| 15th century

| 

| 1238517
 style="vertical-align:center; text-align:center;"    

|- class="vcard with_image"
! scope="row" class="fn org" | Dillington House
| class="label" | Whitelackington
| class="category" | House

| 16th century

| 

| 1057040
   

|- class="vcard without_image"
! scope="row" class="fn org" | Donisthorpe
| class="label" | Somerton
| class="category" | House

| Earlier

| 

| 1056687
 style="vertical-align:center; text-align:center;"    

|- class="vcard with_image"
! scope="row" class="fn org" | Dovecote about 370 metres south of Bruton Church
| class="label" | Bruton
| class="category" | Dovecote

| 16th century

| 

| 1056424
   

|- class="vcard with_image"
! scope="row" class="fn org" | Dovecote in Churchyard, about 15m south west of church, Church of St Mary The Virgin
| class="label" | Norton Sub Hamdon
| class="category" | Dovecote

| 17th century

| 

| 1241076
   

|- class="vcard without_image"
! scope="row" class="fn org" | Dowlish Manor Farmhouse
| class="label" | Dowlish Wake
| class="category" | House

| 11th century

| 

| 1366406
 style="vertical-align:center; text-align:center;"    

|- class="vcard with_image"
! scope="row" class="fn org" | East Lambrook Manor and forecourt wall / Manor Cottage
| class="label" | Kingsbury Episcopi
| class="category" | House

| 15th century

| 

| 1264346
   

|- class="vcard without_image"
! scope="row" class="fn org" | Easton House and forecourt wall
| class="label" | Barrington
| class="category" | House

| c. 1600

| 

| 1236314
 style="vertical-align:center; text-align:center;"    

|- class="vcard without_image"
! scope="row" class="fn org" | Essex House
| class="label" | Chard
| class="category" | House

| Mid 18th century

| 

| 1297112
 style="vertical-align:center; text-align:center;"    

|- class="vcard without_image"
! scope="row" class="fn org" | Factory Building, formerly of Gifford Fox and Company Limited
| class="label" | Chard
| class="category" | Factory

| 1820-1830

| 

| 1197481
 style="vertical-align:center; text-align:center;"    

|- class="vcard without_image"
! scope="row" class="fn org" | Former Priests House
| class="label" | Wayford
| class="category" | House

| 15th century

| 

| 1056167
 style="vertical-align:center; text-align:center;"    

|- class="vcard with_image"
! scope="row" class="fn org" | Front boundary wall, piers and gate, 15 metres north of Manor Farm House
| class="label" | Charlton Horethorne
| class="category" | Farmhouse

| 18th century

| 

| 1174379
   

|- class="vcard with_image"
! scope="row" class="fn org" | Gants Mill
| class="label" | Pitcombe
| class="category" | Mill

| 1810-c. 1830

| 

| 1251831
   

|- class="vcard without_image"
! scope="row" class="fn org" | Gatehouse to Cathanger
| class="label" | Fivehead
| class="category" | Gatehouse

| Late 16th century

| 

| 1249561
 style="vertical-align:center; text-align:center;"    

|- class="vcard without_image"
! scope="row" class="fn org" | Gate-piers and boundary walling to the Manor House and Mallet Court, bounding gardens
| class="label" | Curry Mallet
| class="category" | House

| 16th century

| 

| 1248996
 style="vertical-align:center; text-align:center;"    

|- class="vcard without_image"
! scope="row" class="fn org" | Gazebo, Steps, Terraces and Walls to North West of Merefield House
| class="label" | Crewkerne
| class="category" | Wall

| Early 18th century

| 

| 1208228
 style="vertical-align:center; text-align:center;"    

|- class="vcard with_image"
! scope="row" class="fn org" | George Hotel
| class="label" | Ilminster
| class="category" | Hotel

| Mid 17th century

| 

| 1298349
   

|- class="vcard without_image"
! scope="row" class="fn org" | Godminster Manor
| class="label" | Pitcombe
| class="category" | House

| 15th century

| 

| 1251806
 style="vertical-align:center; text-align:center;"    

|- class="vcard with_image"
! scope="row" class="fn org" | Group of eight Monuments in Churchyard, South and West of Nave, Church of St Andrew
| class="label" | Brympton d'Evercy
| class="category" | Tombs

| 17th century

| 

| 1263241
   

|- class="vcard without_image"
! scope="row" class="fn org" | Hadspen House
| class="label" | Pitcombe
| class="category" | House

| 18th century

| 

| 1251809
 style="vertical-align:center; text-align:center;"    

|- class="vcard without_image"
! scope="row" class="fn org" | Haselbury Old Bridge
| class="label" | Haselbury Plucknett
| class="category" | Bridge

| 14th century

| 

| 1056146
 style="vertical-align:center; text-align:center;"    

|- class="vcard without_image"
! scope="row" class="fn org" | Heale House
| class="label" | Curry Rivel
| class="category" | House

| 17th century

| 

| 1249228
 style="vertical-align:center; text-align:center;"    

|- class="vcard with_image"
! scope="row" class="fn org" | Hendford Manor
| class="label" | Yeovil
| class="category" | House

| C. 1720

| 

| 1296434
   

|- class="vcard without_image"
! scope="row" class="fn org" | Henley Manor Farmhouse
| class="label" | West Crewkerne
| class="category" | Farmhouse

| Early 17th century

| 

| 1175987
 style="vertical-align:center; text-align:center;"    

|- class="vcard without_image"
! scope="row" class="fn org" | Hey Farmhouse
| class="label" | Winsham
| class="category" | Farmhouse

| c. 1500

| 

| 1307250
 style="vertical-align:center; text-align:center;"    

|- class="vcard without_image"
! scope="row" class="fn org" | High Leaze Farmhouse
| class="label" | Brympton
| class="category" | Farmhouse

| 17th century

| 

| 1345772
 style="vertical-align:center; text-align:center;"    

|- class="vcard without_image"
! scope="row" class="fn org" | Higher Farmhouse
| class="label" | Dowlish Wake
| class="category" | Farmhouse

| Late 16th century

| 

| 1240334
 style="vertical-align:center; text-align:center;"    

|- class="vcard with_image"
! scope="row" class="fn org" | Hinton House (South Range)
| class="label" | Hinton St George
| class="category" | House

| Medieval

| 

| 1175284
   

|- class="vcard without_image"
! scope="row" class="fn org" | Home Farmhouse and Farm Buildings attached to North East corner of Brympton House
| class="label" | Brympton
| class="category" | Farmhouse

| 18th century

| 

| 1057267
 style="vertical-align:center; text-align:center;"    

|- class="vcard without_image"
! scope="row" class="fn org" | Homefield
| class="label" | Norton Sub Hamdon
| class="category" | House

| 16th century

| 

| 1241341
 style="vertical-align:center; text-align:center;"    

|- class="vcard without_image"
! scope="row" class="fn org" | Honeywick
| class="label" | Pitcombe
| class="category" | Farmhouse

| 18th century

| 

| 1262425
 style="vertical-align:center; text-align:center;"    

|- class="vcard without_image"
! scope="row" class="fn org" | Hurds Mill House and Courtyard Walling
| class="label" | Curry Rivel
| class="category" | House

| Late 18th century

| 

| 1249226
 style="vertical-align:center; text-align:center;"    

|- class="vcard without_image"
! scope="row" class="fn org" | Key Farm House
| class="label" | East Coker
| class="category" | Farmhouse

| c. 1600

| 

| 1057188
 style="vertical-align:center; text-align:center;"    

|- class="vcard without_image"
! scope="row" class="fn org" | Kincora and attached railings
| class="label" | Crewkerne
| class="category" | House

| 17th century

| 

| 1281924
 style="vertical-align:center; text-align:center;"    

|- class="vcard without_image"
! scope="row" class="fn org" | Kingstone Farmhouse
| class="label" | Kingstone
| class="category" | Farmhouse

| Early 16th century

| 

| 1056988
 style="vertical-align:center; text-align:center;"    

|- class="vcard without_image"
! scope="row" class="fn org" | Lancin Farmhouse
| class="label" | Wambrook
| class="category" | Farmhouse

| Late medieval

| 

| 1277516
 style="vertical-align:center; text-align:center;"    

|- class="vcard without_image"
! scope="row" class="fn org" | Langford Fivehead
| class="label" | Fivehead
| class="category" | House

| 1905

| 

| 1263649
 style="vertical-align:center; text-align:center;"    

|- class="vcard without_image"
! scope="row" class="fn org" | Leigh House
| class="label" | Winsham
| class="category" | House

| 15th century

| 

| 1056141
 style="vertical-align:center; text-align:center;"    

|- class="vcard without_image"
! scope="row" class="fn org" | Lockyer's Farmhouse
| class="label" | Compton Dundon
| class="category" | Farmhouse

| Medieval

| 

| 1307775
 style="vertical-align:center; text-align:center;"    

|- class="vcard with_image"
! scope="row" class="fn org" | Long Load Bridge
| class="label" | Long Load
| class="category" | Bridge

| Medieval

| 

| 1267215
   

|- class="vcard without_image"
! scope="row" class="fn org" | Lower Cockhill Farmhouse, with Mounting Block 5 metres West
| class="label" | Castle Cary
| class="category" | Farmhouse

| Late 15th century/early 16th century

| 

| 1177369
 style="vertical-align:center; text-align:center;"    

|- class="vcard without_image"
! scope="row" class="fn org" | Lullingstone
| class="label" | Winsham
| class="category" | House

| 16th century

| 

| 1056176
 style="vertical-align:center; text-align:center;"    

|- class="vcard with_image"
! scope="row" class="fn org" | Madey Mill
| class="label" | Martock
| class="category" | Watermill

| Medieval

| 

| 1226550
   

|- class="vcard with_image"
! scope="row" class="fn org" | Main Building of the former Parrett Iron Works
| class="label" | Martock
| class="category" | Foundry

| Maybe 18th century

| 

| 1225080
   

|- class="vcard without_image"
! scope="row" class="fn org" | Manning Chest Tomb, in Churchyard 4 metres South of South East Corner Church of St John the Baptist
| class="label" | Brewham
| class="category" | Chest Tomb

| 1618

| 

| 1056464
 style="vertical-align:center; text-align:center;"    

|- class="vcard without_image"
! scope="row" class="fn org" | Mannings
| class="label" | Stocklinch
| class="category" | Farmhouse

| 15th century

| 

| 1308307
 style="vertical-align:center; text-align:center;"    

|- class="vcard with_image"
! scope="row" class="fn org" | Manor Farm House
| class="label" | Charlton Horethorne
| class="category" | House

| 1608

| 

| 1056363
   

|- class="vcard without_image"
! scope="row" class="fn org" | Manor Farm House
| class="label" | Mudford
| class="category" | House

| 1630

| 

| 1056802
 style="vertical-align:center; text-align:center;"    

|- class="vcard without_image"
! scope="row" class="fn org" | Manor Farmhouse
| class="label" | Beercrocombe
| class="category" | Farmhouse

| 1600

| 

| 1249063
 style="vertical-align:center; text-align:center;"    

|- class="vcard without_image"
! scope="row" class="fn org" | Manor Farmhouse
| class="label" | Charlton Mackrell
| class="category" | Farmhouse

| Medieval

| 

| 1056724
 style="vertical-align:center; text-align:center;"    

|- class="vcard without_image"
! scope="row" class="fn org" | Manor Farmhouse
| class="label" | High Ham
| class="category" | Farmhouse

| 17th century

| 

| 1235211
 style="vertical-align:center; text-align:center;"    

|- class="vcard without_image"
! scope="row" class="fn org" | Manor Farmhouse
| class="label" | Tatworth and Forton
| class="category" | Farmhouse

| Late Medieval

| 

| 1248812
 style="vertical-align:center; text-align:center;"    

|- class="vcard without_image"
! scope="row" class="fn org" | Manor Farmhouse
| class="label" | West and Middle Chinnock
| class="category" | Farmhouse

| Late 16th century/early 17th century

| 

| 1057127
 style="vertical-align:center; text-align:center;"    

|- class="vcard without_image"
! scope="row" class="fn org" | Manor Farmhouse and front boundary railings
| class="label" | Ash
| class="category" | Farmhouse

| Early 17th century

| 

| 1056534
 style="vertical-align:center; text-align:center;"    

|- class="vcard without_image"
! scope="row" class="fn org" | Manor House
| class="label" | Abbas and Templecombe
| class="category" | House

| 17th century

| 

| 1056356
 style="vertical-align:center; text-align:center;"    

|- class="vcard without_image"
! scope="row" class="fn org" | Manor House
| class="label" | Marston Magna
| class="category" | House

| 1613

| 

| 1056828
 style="vertical-align:center; text-align:center;"    

|- class="vcard without_image"
! scope="row" class="fn org" | Manor House
| class="label" | Misterton
| class="category" | House

| Mid 18th century

| 

| 1308208
 style="vertical-align:center; text-align:center;"    

|- class="vcard without_image"
! scope="row" class="fn org" | Manor House, King Ina's Palace
| class="label" | South Petherton
| class="category" | House

| 16th century

| 

| 1056956
 style="vertical-align:center; text-align:center;"    

|- class="vcard without_image"
! scope="row" class="fn org" | Maperton House
| class="label" | Maperton
| class="category" | House

| 1802

| 

| 1177942
 style="vertical-align:center; text-align:center;"    

|- class="vcard without_image"
! scope="row" class="fn org" | Merefield House
| class="label" | Crewkerne
| class="category" | House

| Mid 17th century

| 

| 1208219
 style="vertical-align:center; text-align:center;"    

|- class="vcard with_image"
! scope="row" class="fn org" | Mid Lambrook Manor
| class="label" | Kingsbury Episcopi
| class="category" | Farmhouse

| c. 1500

| 

| 1264344
   

|- class="vcard without_image"
! scope="row" class="fn org" | Middlethorpe House
| class="label" | Curry Rivel
| class="category" | House

| 17th century

| 

| 1249233
 style="vertical-align:center; text-align:center;"    

|- class="vcard without_image"
! scope="row" class="fn org" | Mill, attached House and former Drying Kiln
| class="label" | West Crewkerne
| class="category" | Watermill

| 1793

| 

| 1400079
 style="vertical-align:center; text-align:center;"    

|- class="vcard with_image"
! scope="row" class="fn org" | Monks' Reredorter, Muchelney Abbey
| class="label" | Muchelney
| class="category" | Privy House

| 13th century

| 

| 1056573
   

|- class="vcard with_image"
! scope="row" class="fn org" | Monmouth House and attached Walls and Railings
| class="label" | Chard
| class="category" | House

| 1770-1790

| 

| 1205613
   

|- class="vcard without_image"
! scope="row" class="fn org" | Naish's Farm House, with front boundary wall and gate piers
| class="label" | West Camel
| class="category" | Farmhouse

| Early 18th century

| 

| 1345993
 style="vertical-align:center; text-align:center;"    

|- class="vcard with_image"
! scope="row" class="fn org" | National Westminster Bank
| class="label" | Crewkerne
| class="category" | Bank

| 1838

| 

| 1208423
   

|- class="vcard with_image"
! scope="row" class="fn org" | 3 (Hayes End Manor), 5 and 7, Hayes End
| class="label" | South Petherton
| class="category" | House

| c. 1600

| 

| 1056974
   

|- class="vcard without_image"
! scope="row" class="fn org" | 18 and 20, High Street
| class="label" | Bruton
| class="category" | House

| 16th century

| 

| 1056419
 style="vertical-align:center; text-align:center;"    

|- class="vcard without_image"
! scope="row" class="fn org" | 17, North Street
| class="label" | Chiselborough
| class="category" | House

| Possibly Late 16th century

| 

| 1251532
 style="vertical-align:center; text-align:center;"    

|- class="vcard without_image"
! scope="row" class="fn org" | 9, Church Street
| class="label" | Crewkerne
| class="category" | House

| Mid 19th century

| 

| 1202987
 style="vertical-align:center; text-align:center;"    

|- class="vcard without_image"
! scope="row" class="fn org" | 29, Court Barton
| class="label" | Ilminster
| class="category" | House

| Early 16th century

| 

| 1207652
 style="vertical-align:center; text-align:center;"    

|- class="vcard without_image"
! scope="row" class="fn org" | 28, Court Barton
| class="label" | Ilminster
| class="category" | House

| 1586

| 

| 1298320
 style="vertical-align:center; text-align:center;"    

|- class="vcard without_image"
! scope="row" class="fn org" | 21, Woolston Road
| class="label" | North Cadbury
| class="category" | House

| 15th century

| 

| 1056206
 style="vertical-align:center; text-align:center;"    

|- class="vcard with_image"
! scope="row" class="fn org" | North Perrott Manor House / Perrott Hill School
| class="label" | North Perrott
| class="category" | House

| 1877

| 

| 1175931
   

|- class="vcard without_image"
! scope="row" class="fn org" | 2 and 3, and attached railings, gate piers and gates
| class="label" | Whitelackington
| class="category" | House

| Early 19th century

| 

| 1195064
 style="vertical-align:center; text-align:center;"    

|- class="vcard without_image"
! scope="row" class="fn org" | 19–21, attached gateway and outbuildings to the rear of No. 19, Silver Street
| class="label" | Ilminster
| class="category" | House

| Possible 17th century

| 

| 1208520
 style="vertical-align:center; text-align:center;"    

|- class="vcard without_image"
! scope="row" class="fn org" | Old Somerton Mill
| class="label" | Somerton
| class="category" | House

| 16th century

| 

| 1346032
 style="vertical-align:center; text-align:center;"    

|- class="vcard without_image"
! scope="row" class="fn org" | Oscars
| class="label" | Crewkerne
| class="category" | House

| Early 16th century

| 

| 1202968
 style="vertical-align:center; text-align:center;"    

|- class="vcard without_image"
! scope="row" class="fn org" | Oxenford House, and the cottage attached to west gable with pump
| class="label" | Dowlish Wake
| class="category" | Farmhouse

| 17th century

| 

| 1307531
 style="vertical-align:center; text-align:center;"    

|- class="vcard with_image"
! scope="row" class="fn org" | Pavyotts Mill House
| class="label" | East Coker
| class="category" | Mill House

| c. 1600

| 

| 1307789
   

|- class="vcard without_image"
! scope="row" class="fn org" | Pen Pits
| class="label" | Penselwood
| class="category" | House

| 1935

| 

| 1274243
 style="vertical-align:center; text-align:center;"    

|- class="vcard without_image"
! scope="row" class="fn org" | Penny Tombstone, in churchyard 11 metres south of chancel, Church of St Peter and St Paul
| class="label" | Charlton Horethorne
| class="category" | Tombstone

| Late 17th century

| 

| 1056367
 style="vertical-align:center; text-align:center;"    

|- class="vcard without_image"
! scope="row" class="fn org" | Physicwell House
| class="label" | Stoke Trister
| class="category" | Farmhouse

| Converted 1819

| 

| 1238359
 style="vertical-align:center; text-align:center;"    

|- class="vcard without_image"
! scope="row" class="fn org" | Pittards Farmhouse
| class="label" | Kingsbury Episcopi
| class="category" | Farmhouse

| 17th century

| 

| 1345545
 style="vertical-align:center; text-align:center;"    

|- class="vcard without_image"
! scope="row" class="fn org" | Prankerd Chest Tomb, in churchyard 7 metres south east of south door, Church of St John Evangelist
| class="label" | Milborne Port
| class="category" | Chest Tomb

| Early 17th century

| 

| 1174727
 style="vertical-align:center; text-align:center;"    

|- class="vcard without_image"
! scope="row" class="fn org" | Priory Farmhouse
| class="label" | Hinton St George
| class="category" | House

| 14th century/15th century

| 

| 1175241
 style="vertical-align:center; text-align:center;"    

|- class="vcard without_image"
! scope="row" class="fn org" | Privy about 35 metres south of the Manor House
| class="label" | Chilthorne Domer
| class="category" | Privy House

| Mid 18th century

| 

| 1057248
 style="vertical-align:center; text-align:center;"    

|- class="vcard with_image"
! scope="row" class="fn org" | Red Lion Hotel, with front boundary railings attached
| class="label" | Somerton
| class="category" | Hotel

| 17th/18th century

| 

| 1177452
   

|- class="vcard with_image"
! scope="row" class="fn org" | Rodwell Manor
| class="label" | Kingsbury Episcopi
| class="category" | House

| 1988

| 

| 1264305
   

|- class="vcard without_image"
! scope="row" class="fn org" | Rowland's Farm House, and attached outbuildings around courtyard on north side, including well
| class="label" | Ashill
| class="category" | Farmhouse

| c. 1750

| 

| 1057097
 style="vertical-align:center; text-align:center;"    

|- class="vcard without_image"
! scope="row" class="fn org" | Rowland's Mill
| class="label" | Ashill
| class="category" | Mill House

| Late 17th century

| 

| 1345847
 style="vertical-align:center; text-align:center;"    

|- class="vcard with_image"
! scope="row" class="fn org" | Stable block about 70 metres west of Brympton House
| class="label" | Brympton
| class="category" | House

| c. 1720

| 

| 1057265
   

|- class="vcard without_image"
! scope="row" class="fn org" | Standerwick Farm
| class="label" | Babcary
| class="category" | Farmhouse

| c. 1400

| 

| 1248456
 style="vertical-align:center; text-align:center;"    

|- class="vcard without_image"
! scope="row" class="fn org" | Stapleton Farmhouse
| class="label" | Martock
| class="category" | Farmhouse

| Medieval

| 

| 1227081
 style="vertical-align:center; text-align:center;"    

|- class="vcard with_image"
! scope="row" class="fn org" | Stembridge Mill
| class="label" | High Ham
| class="category" | Mill

| 1897

| 

| 1235260
   

|- class="vcard without_image"
! scope="row" class="fn org" | Stocklinch Grove
| class="label" | Stocklinch
| class="category" | House

| 1653

| 

| 1345871
 style="vertical-align:center; text-align:center;"    

|- class="vcard with_image"
! scope="row" class="fn org" | United Reformed Church
| class="label" | Stoke-sub-Hamdon
| class="category" | Church

| 1866

| 

| 1260181
   

|- class="vcard without_image"
! scope="row" class="fn org" | Summerhouse about 15 metres north west of the Manor House
| class="label" | Norton Sub Hamdon
| class="category" | House

| 18th century

| 

| 1241090
 style="vertical-align:center; text-align:center;"    

|- class="vcard without_image"
! scope="row" class="fn org" | Swadel Chest Tomb, 8 metres south of the south door of the chancel, Church of St Peter
| class="label" | Yeovilton
| class="category" | Chest Tomb

| 1593

| 

| 1175211
 style="vertical-align:center; text-align:center;"    

|- class="vcard without_image"
! scope="row" class="fn org" | The Chantry
| class="label" | Ilminster
| class="category" | House

| Mid 15th century

| 

| 1207664
 style="vertical-align:center; text-align:center;"    

|- class="vcard without_image"
! scope="row" class="fn org" | The Chantry
| class="label" | Martock
| class="category" | House

| 14th century

| 

| 1066030
 style="vertical-align:center; text-align:center;"    

|- class="vcard with_image"
! scope="row" class="fn org" | The Choughs Public House
| class="label" | Chard
| class="category" | House

| Early 17th century or late 16th century

| 

| 1280479
   

|- class="vcard without_image"
! scope="row" class="fn org" | The Coign
| class="label" | Rimpton
| class="category" | House

| 16th century

| 

| 1295557
 style="vertical-align:center; text-align:center;"    

|- class="vcard without_image"
! scope="row" class="fn org" | The Court
| class="label" | Charlton Mackrell
| class="category" | House

| 1792

| 

| 1056732
 style="vertical-align:center; text-align:center;"    

|- class="vcard without_image"
! scope="row" class="fn org" | The Dovecot, 30 metres north east of Godminster Manor
| class="label" | Pitcombe
| class="category" | Dovecote

| 17th century

| 

| 1251807
 style="vertical-align:center; text-align:center;"    

|- class="vcard without_image"
! scope="row" class="fn org" | The Dower House
| class="label" | Tintinhull
| class="category" | House

| Later 17th century

| 

| 1227288
 style="vertical-align:center; text-align:center;"    

|- class="vcard without_image"
! scope="row" class="fn org" | The former ropewalk 75 metres north west of Millbrook House
| class="label" | West Coker
| class="category" | Ropewalk

| c. 1886

| 

| 1057092
 style="vertical-align:center; text-align:center;"    

|- class="vcard without_image"
! scope="row" class="fn org" | The Gables
| class="label" | Stoke-sub-Hamdon
| class="category" | House

| c. 1600

| 

| 1242144
 style="vertical-align:center; text-align:center;"    

|- class="vcard without_image"
! scope="row" class="fn org" | The Garden Sculpture, 20 metres north of porch to Shanks House
| class="label" | Cucklington
| class="category" | Sculpture

| Probably 18th century

| 

| 1056388
 style="vertical-align:center; text-align:center;"    

|- class="vcard without_image"
! scope="row" class="fn org" | The Granary, 20 metres east of Godminster Manor
| class="label" | Pitcombe
| class="category" | Granary

| 18th century

| 

| 1251988
 style="vertical-align:center; text-align:center;"    

|- class="vcard without_image"
! scope="row" class="fn org" | The Grotto at Jordans
| class="label" | Ashill
| class="category" | Grotto

| 1828

| 

| 1057070
 style="vertical-align:center; text-align:center;"    

|- class="vcard with_image"
! scope="row" class="fn org" | The Guildhall
| class="label" | Chard
| class="category" | Corn Exchange

| 1834

| 

| 1197456
   

|- class="vcard with_image"
! scope="row" class="fn org" | The Hext Almshouses
| class="label" | Somerton
| class="category" | Almshouse

| 1626

| 

| 1295258
   

|- class="vcard with_image"
! scope="row" class="fn org" | The Langport Arms Hotel
| class="label" | Langport
| class="category" | Hotel

| 16th century

| 

| 1056611
   

|- class="vcard without_image"
! scope="row" class="fn org" | The Limes
| class="label" | Curry Rivel
| class="category" | House

| Early 18th century

| 

| 1249458
 style="vertical-align:center; text-align:center;"    

|- class="vcard with_image"
! scope="row" class="fn org" | The Lodge, about 165m south-south-west of Montacute House
| class="label" | Montacute
| class="category" | House

| 16th century

| 

| 1252028
   

|- class="vcard without_image"
! scope="row" class="fn org" | The Manor House
| class="label" | Barton St David
| class="category" | House

| 19th century

| 

| 1176131
 style="vertical-align:center; text-align:center;"    

|- class="vcard without_image"
! scope="row" class="fn org" | The Manor House
| class="label" | Bruton
| class="category" | House

| 15th century

| 

| 1366340
 style="vertical-align:center; text-align:center;"    

|- class="vcard without_image"
! scope="row" class="fn org" | The Manor House
| class="label" | Curry Mallet
| class="category" | House

| 15th century

| 

| 1249147
 style="vertical-align:center; text-align:center;"    

|- class="vcard without_image"
! scope="row" class="fn org" | The Manor House
| class="label" | Long Sutton
| class="category" | House

| Late 15th century

| 

| 1264755
 style="vertical-align:center; text-align:center;"    

|- class="vcard without_image"
! scope="row" class="fn org" | The Manor House
| class="label" | North Cadbury
| class="category" | House

| 1723

| 

| 1366409
 style="vertical-align:center; text-align:center;"    

|- class="vcard with_image"
! scope="row" class="fn org" | The Market Cross
| class="label" | Somerton
| class="category" | Market Cross

| Rebuilt 1673

| 

| 1177350
   

|- class="vcard with_image"
! scope="row" class="fn org" | Market House
| class="label" | Castle Cary
| class="category" | Market House

| 1855

| 

| 1056254
   

|- class="vcard without_image"
! scope="row" class="fn org" | The Market House
| class="label" | Somerton
| class="category" | House

| 17th century

| 

| 1056698
 style="vertical-align:center; text-align:center;"    

|- class="vcard without_image"
! scope="row" class="fn org" | The Music Room, 90 metres north west of Pen Pits
| class="label" | Penselwood
| class="category" | Summerhouse

| 1935

| 

| 1274224
 style="vertical-align:center; text-align:center;"    

|- class="vcard without_image"
! scope="row" class="fn org" | The Old Cottage
| class="label" | Charlton Mackrell
| class="category" | House

| 16th century

| 

| 1056733
 style="vertical-align:center; text-align:center;"    

|- class="vcard without_image"
! scope="row" class="fn org" | The Old Parsonage
| class="label" | Ansford
| class="category" | House

| 17th century

| 

| 1366372
 style="vertical-align:center; text-align:center;"    

|- class="vcard without_image"
! scope="row" class="fn org" | The Old Parsonage
| class="label" | Somerton
| class="category" | House

| Early 17th century

| 

| 1177683
 style="vertical-align:center; text-align:center;"    

|- class="vcard without_image"
! scope="row" class="fn org" | The Old Rectory
| class="label" | Chaffcombe
| class="category" | House

| 15th century

| 

| 1366437
 style="vertical-align:center; text-align:center;"    

|- class="vcard without_image"
! scope="row" class="fn org" | The Old Rectory, with boundary wall attached to south east corner
| class="label" | Ashill
| class="category" | House

| 16th century

| 

| 1295733
 style="vertical-align:center; text-align:center;"    

|- class="vcard without_image"
! scope="row" class="fn org" | The Pines
| class="label" | Castle Cary
| class="category" | House

| Late 18th century

| 

| 1056229
 style="vertical-align:center; text-align:center;"    

|- class="vcard with_image"
! scope="row" class="fn org" | The Priory
| class="label" | Bruton
| class="category" | House

| 15th century

| 

| 1176057
   

|- class="vcard without_image"
! scope="row" class="fn org" | The Priory, including attached wall with 2 gatepiers to left
| class="label" | Barrington
| class="category" | House

| Late medieval

| 

| 1345924
 style="vertical-align:center; text-align:center;"    

|- class="vcard without_image"
! scope="row" class="fn org" | The railings, gate and gate piers about 9 metes south of Donisthorpe
| class="label" | Somerton
| class="category" | Gate

| Probably 18th century

| 

| 1056688
 style="vertical-align:center; text-align:center;"    

|- class="vcard with_image"
! scope="row" class="fn org" | The Rectory
| class="label" | West Camel
| class="category" | House

| Early 15th century

| 

| 1175050
   

|- class="vcard without_image"
! scope="row" class="fn org" | The Towers
| class="label" | Bruton
| class="category" | Gate

| Late 18th century

| 

| 1176423
 style="vertical-align:center; text-align:center;"    

|- class="vcard with_image"
! scope="row" class="fn org" | The Unicorn
| class="label" | Somerton
| class="category" | Inn

| Late Medieval or 16th century

| 

| 1056646
   

|- class="vcard without_image"
! scope="row" class="fn org" | The Vicarage
| class="label" | Somerton
| class="category" | House

| Medieval

| 

| 1177266
 style="vertical-align:center; text-align:center;"    

|- class="vcard with_image"
! scope="row" class="fn org" | The Village Cross
| class="label" | Hinton St George
| class="category" | Village Cross

| Late medieval

| 

| 1056096
   

|- class="vcard without_image"
! scope="row" class="fn org" | Thorne Chest Tomb, 2 metres north of organ chamber door, churchyard of Church of St Lawrence
| class="label" | Cucklington
| class="category" | Chest Tomb

| 1617

| 

| 1346186
 style="vertical-align:center; text-align:center;"    

|- class="vcard without_image"
! scope="row" class="fn org" | Top Mill Building
| class="label" | Castle Cary
| class="category" | Factory

| Mid 19th century

| 

| 1056226
 style="vertical-align:center; text-align:center;"    

|- class="vcard with_image"
! scope="row" class="fn org" | Triumphal arch gateway to Hazelgrove House
| class="label" | Sparkford
| class="category" | Gate

| Early 20th century

| 

| 1272919
   

|- class="vcard without_image"
! scope="row" class="fn org" | Tudor Cottage
| class="label" | Broadway
| class="category" | Farmhouse

| 16th century

| 

| 1057044
 style="vertical-align:center; text-align:center;"    

|- class="vcard without_image"
! scope="row" class="fn org" | Two monuments in churchyard, about 6 and 8 metres south of south transept, Church of St Mary the Virgin
| class="label" | Stoke-sub-Hamdon
| class="category" | Chest Tomb

| Mid 17th century

| 

| 1242030
 style="vertical-align:center; text-align:center;"    

|- class="vcard without_image"
! scope="row" class="fn org" | Under Sheriff's Office
| class="label" | South Petherton
| class="category" | House

| 20th century

| 

| 1056926
 style="vertical-align:center; text-align:center;"    

|- class="vcard without_image"
! scope="row" class="fn org" | Unitarian Church and attached schoolhouse to the north
| class="label" | Ilminster
| class="category" | Church

| 1846

| 

| 1298327
 style="vertical-align:center; text-align:center;"    

|- class="vcard without_image"
! scope="row" class="fn org" | Wales Cottages, row of cottages about 10 metres north east of Wales Farmhouse
| class="label" | Queen Camel
| class="category" | House

| 15th century

| 

| 1248860
 style="vertical-align:center; text-align:center;"    

|- class="vcard without_image"
! scope="row" class="fn org" | Wales Farmhouse
| class="label" | Queen Camel
| class="category" | Farmhouse

| 17th century

| 

| 1248859
 style="vertical-align:center; text-align:center;"    

|- class="vcard without_image"
! scope="row" class="fn org" | Walls, gate piers, gates and railings to Merefield House
| class="label" | Crewkerne
| class="category" | Gate

| Late 17th century

| 

| 1281891
 style="vertical-align:center; text-align:center;"    

|- class="vcard without_image"
! scope="row" class="fn org" | Weston Farmhouse
| class="label" | Wambrook
| class="category" | Farmhouse

| Late medieval

| 

| 1249296
 style="vertical-align:center; text-align:center;"    

|- class="vcard without_image"
! scope="row" class="fn org" | Weston House
| class="label" | East Chinnock
| class="category" | Farmhouse

| 17th century

| 

| 1057208
 style="vertical-align:center; text-align:center;"    

|- class="vcard without_image"
! scope="row" class="fn org" | Weylands
| class="label" | Kingsbury Episcopi
| class="category" | House

| 16th century

| 

| 1057725
 style="vertical-align:center; text-align:center;"    

|- class="vcard without_image"
! scope="row" class="fn org" | White Horse Hotel
| class="label" | Wincanton
| class="category" | Hotel

| 1733

| 

| 1274102
 style="vertical-align:center; text-align:center;"    

|- class="vcard without_image"
! scope="row" class="fn org" | Whitelackington House, and gazebos to south east and south west corners
| class="label" | Whitelackington
| class="category" | House

| 17th century

| 

| 1308161
 style="vertical-align:center; text-align:center;"    

|- class="vcard with_image"
! scope="row" class="fn org" | Wing to Barrington Court
| class="label" | Barrington
| class="category" | House

| 1674

| 

| 1056932
   

|- class="vcard without_image"
! scope="row" class="fn org" | Woodlands Farmhouse
| class="label" | Isle Abbotts
| class="category" | Farmhouse

| 17th century

| 

| 1249931
 style="vertical-align:center; text-align:center;"    

|- class="vcard without_image"
! scope="row" class="fn org" | Yarlington House
| class="label" | Yarlington
| class="category" | House

| 1782

| 

| 1056215
 style="vertical-align:center; text-align:center;"    
|}

Notes

See also
 Grade II* listed buildings in Somerset
 Grade I listed buildings in South Somerset

References

The National Heritage List for England (NHLE) is published by Historic England.

External links

 
Lists of Grade II* listed buildings in Somerset